Anthony Jean-Louis Moulin (born 4 January 1986) is a French footballer currently playing for Colombier.

Career statistics

Club

Notes

References

1986 births
Living people
French footballers
French expatriate footballers
Association football defenders
Singapore Premier League players
Expatriate footballers in Singapore
French expatriate sportspeople in Singapore
Expatriate footballers in Switzerland
French expatriate sportspeople in Switzerland
Étoile FC players
People from Le Puy-en-Velay
Sportspeople from Haute-Loire
Footballers from Auvergne-Rhône-Alpes